CMB is the cosmic microwave background, the thermal radiation left over from the time of recombination in Big Bang cosmology.

CMB may also refer to:

Science and technology
 Core–mantle boundary, lying between the Earth's silicate mantle and its metallic outer core
 Continuous marine broadcast, a type of radio station providing marine weather information to coastal areas of Canada

Arts and entertainment
 C.M.B. (album), the debut album of American R&B and pop group Color Me Badd
 Color Me Badd, American R&B and pop group
 C.M.B. (manga), a detective fiction manga by Motohiro Katoui
 CMB Televisión, a religious TV channel in Colombia
 The Cosmic Microwave Background, the debut solo album of Shiny Joe Ryan
The Combine, the antagonistic alien empire from the Half-Life video game series

Organizations
 Cavalier Marching Band, marching band of the University of Virginia, US
 Center for Mind and Brain, cognitive neuroscience research center at the University of California, US
 China Medical Board, organization promoting medical education and research in China
 China Merchants Bank, bank headquartered in Shenzhen, China
 China Motor Bus, first motor bus company in Hong Kong
 Compagnie Maritime Belge, one of the oldest ship-owners of Antwerp, Belgium
 Compagnie Monégasque de Banque, private bank of Monaco
Compagnie des Machines Bull, French computer manufacturer
 Union of the Belgian Metal Industry, trade union in Belgium

Other uses
 Bandaranaike International Airport (IATA code: CMB), an airport in Sri Lanka
 Cambodia, UNDP country code
 Christus Mansionem Benedicat (English: May Christ Bless This House), text written in chalk on house doors on the day of Epiphany
 Certified Mortgage Banker, a certification offered by the Mortgage Bankers Association
 Coastal Motor Boat, torpedo boats built and used by Britain in both World Wars
 Combat Medical Badge, a decoration of the United States Army

See also
 Cell and molecular biology